These are the official results of the men's decathlon competition at the 1986 European Athletics Championships in Stuttgart, West Germany, held at Neckarstadion on 27 and 28 August 1986.

Medalists

Final

Participation
According to an unofficial count, 23 athletes from 12 countries participated in the event.

 (1)
 (1)
 (2)
 (1)
 (3)
 (1)
 (1)
 (3)
 (3)
 (2)
 (2)
 (3)

See also
 Athletics at the 1984 Summer Olympics – Men's decathlon
 1987 World Championships in Athletics – Men's decathlon
 1986 Hypo-Meeting
 Athletics at the 1988 Summer Olympics – Men's decathlon

References

 Results
 1986 details

Decathlon
Combined events at the European Athletics Championships